Roberto Gamper (born 31 August 1943) is an Italian ice hockey player. He competed in the men's tournament at the 1964 Winter Olympics.

References

1943 births
Living people
Olympic ice hockey players of Italy
Italian expatriate sportspeople in Monaco
Ice hockey players at the 1964 Winter Olympics
People from Monte Carlo